Walter Wedgwood (23 October 1912 – 2 December 1977) was an Australian cricketer. He played one first-class cricket match for Victoria in 1930.

See also
 List of Victoria first-class cricketers

References

External links
 

1912 births
1977 deaths
Australian cricketers
Victoria cricketers
Cricketers from Melbourne